As Daylight Dies is the fourth studio album by American metalcore band Killswitch Engage. It was released on November 21, 2006 through Roadrunner Records. It was produced by Adam Dutkiewicz and Joel Stroetzel.

Background and release 
The album was released on November 13, 2006 through Roadrunner Records. It peaked at number 32 on the Billboard 200,  selling up to 60,000 copies within its first week. It also peaked within the Rock, Hard Rock, and Digital Albums Charts. The album was certified Gold by the RIAA on June 30, 2009, which was on the same date of the release of its successor, Killswitch Engage. It has since gone on to sell more than 500,000 copies in the United States alone. The album was later certified platinum on November 24, 2021 by the RIAA, indicating sales of 1,000,000 or more.

The album's first single, "My Curse", was released in 2006, and managed to peak at number 21 on the Billboard Rock Songs Chart. The radio edit  strips down most of the track's unclean vocals, replacing them with Howard Jones' re-recorded clean vocals. A music video directed by Lex Halaby (who previously directed the live video for "A Bid Farewell") premiered on MTV 2's Headbangers Ball on November 3, 2006. "My Curse" was included as a playable track in the video game Guitar Hero III: Legends of Rock, and as downloadable content for the video games Rock Band and Rock Band 2.  It was also featured on the soundtrack of the video games Burnout Dominator and Burnout Paradise.  The album's second single, "The Arms of Sorrow", was released in 2007, and peaked at number 30 on the Rock Songs Chart. A music video directed by Aggressive premiered on Headbangers Ball on May 1, 2007.

A special edition was released on August 28, 2007, including four B-sides and a DVD containing three music videos and behind-the-scenes footage. The album's B-side "Holy Diver", a cover of Dio's first single, was released as the album's third single on August 17, 2007. It peaked at number 12 on the Rock Songs Chart, making it the band's highest charting single. A music video directed by Brian Thompson premiered on the band's official Myspace page on August 1, 2007. The video is a comical re-imagining of the original video by Dio. A music video for the album's fourth single, "This Is Absolution", was released in 2008, featuring footage of the band performing the song live, as well as backstage footage. It also released the song "This Fire Burns" (listed in the album as simply "This Fire"), which was the theme song for WWE Judgment Day (2006) and later, the entrance music for professional wrestler CM Punk from 2006 to 2011. It was also used for two occasions by Randy Orton. The song had previously been released on the WWE Wreckless Intent album in May 2006.

Critical reception 

The album has received generally positive reviews from contemporary music critics. Thom Jurek of Allmusic praised the album, scoring it a four and a half out five, positively commenting, "If the cynics don't get it by now, they never will. For the rest, this is the album to come into the tent with." The tracks "This Is Absolution", "Unbroken", and "Eye of the Storm" were indicated as the AMG Track Picks. Raziq Rauf of Drowned In Sound also praised the album, scoring it a nine out of ten and saying, "With As Daylight Dies, Killswitch Engage have cemented their position as the reason for metalcore ever existing."

Track listing

Special edition DVD
 "My Curse" (video)
 "The Arms of Sorrow" (video)
 "Holy Diver" (video)
  "Making-of "videos" for 2 clips ("My Curse" and "The Arms of Sorrow")

Personnel

Killswitch Engage
 Howard Jones – lead vocals
 Adam Dutkiewicz – lead guitar, co-lead vocals, keyboards
 Joel Stroetzel – rhythm guitar, backing vocals
 Mike D'Antonio – bass
 Justin Foley – drums

Production
 Adam Dutkiewicz – production, engineering, mixing
 Ian Neill – assistant engineer at Long View Farm, North Brookfield, Massachusetts
 Ted Jensen – mastering at Sterling Sound, New York, NY
 Mike D'Antonio – digital design, artwork photography, layout design
 Daragh McDonagh – group photography

Management
 Vaughn Lewis and Kenny Gabor for Strong Management
 Tom Cavanaugh and Chuck Mihlek – road crew
 Mike Gitter – A&R
 Mark Scribner – business management at PS Business Management
 Tim Borror – U.S. booking at The Agency Group
 Paul Ryan – international booking at The Agency Group

Chart positions
Album

Certifications

References

2006 albums
Killswitch Engage albums
Roadrunner Records albums
Albums produced by Adam Dutkiewicz
Albums recorded at Long View Farm